Arturo Guerrero Moreno (born 30 August 1948) is a Mexican former basketball player and coach. With Mexico's senior national team, he played at two Summer Olympic Games (1968 and 1976). Due to his shooting ability, he was nicknamed "Mano Santa" ("Holy Hand"). Along with Carlos Quintanar and Manolo Raga, he is generally considered to be one of the two best Mexican basketball players of all time.

Club playing career
Guerrero played club basketball in Mexico, Italy, with the Brazilian club E.C. Sírio, in Puerto Rico, and in Cuba. With E.C. Sírio, he played in the 1973 FIBA Intercontinental Cup's final, and was the top scorer. With Lechugueros de León, he won two Mexican Basketball Circuit (CIMEBA) championships, in 1971 and 1973.

During his club career, the NBA's Los Angeles Lakers, Cleveland Cavaliers, and San Antonio Spurs, offered him contracts. However, he turned the offers down, because since NBA players were not allowed to play in FIBA competitions at that time, he would not have been able to continue to represent Mexico's national team, if he signed with an NBA team.

National team playing career
Guerrero was a member of the senior men's Mexican national basketball teams that competed at the following major FIBA tournaments: the 1967 FIBA World Cup, the 1968 Summer Olympics, the 1972 Pre-Olympic Tournament, the 1974 FIBA World Cup, the 1976 Pre-Olympic Tournament, and the 1976 Summer Olympics.	

With Mexico, Guerrero also won the silver medal at the 1967 Pan American Games, and played at the 1980 FIBA AmeriCup and the 1981 FIBA CentroBasket.

Coaching career
After he ended his basketball playing career, Guerrero became a basketball coach. He was the head coach of the senior men's Mexican national basketball team at the 1991 Pan American Games, the 1992 FIBA AmeriCup, and the 2009 FIBA AmeriCup.

References

External links
FIBA Archive Player Profile
Basketball-Reference.com Player Profile
Sports-Reference.com Player Profile
"Mano Santa" Guerrero, una gloria del deporte mexicano 

1948 births
Living people
Basketball players at the 1967 Pan American Games
Basketball players at the 1968 Summer Olympics
Basketball players at the 1976 Summer Olympics
Basketball players from Guanajuato
Esporte Clube Sírio basketball players
Lechugueros de León players
Mexican basketball coaches
Mexican men's basketball players
1967 FIBA World Championship players
1974 FIBA World Championship players
Olympic basketball players of Mexico
Pan American Games medalists in basketball
Pan American Games silver medalists for Mexico
Small forwards
Sportspeople from León, Guanajuato
Medalists at the 1967 Pan American Games